The Albany Street Bridge is a bridge that carries Route 27 in the U.S. state of New Jersey spanning the Raritan River. The bridge connects Highland Park on the east with New Brunswick on the west. The bridge is so named because Route 27 in New Brunswick, from the Raritan River to Easton Avenue, is known locally as Albany Street.

History

The low stone arch bridge was built in 1887.  It was widened in 1925, ten years after Route 27 had become part of the transcontinental Lincoln Highway.  The bridge received modifications such as the chain link fencing in the 1980s.  From the bridge's centennial in 1987 until 1991, a major renovation created a drastic traffic bottleneck in the area.

From the road, the appearance of the bridge is very modern.  The best views of this historic arch bridge are from the banks of the Raritan River and from the nearby Northeast Corridor railroad bridge.

See also
List of crossings of the Raritan River
Route of the Lincoln Highway

External links 
Historical photographs of the Albany Street Bridge at Rutgers Cartography Lab

Bridges over the Raritan River
Bridges in Middlesex County, New Jersey
Bridges completed in 1887
Road bridges in New Jersey
Highland Park, New Jersey
New Brunswick, New Jersey
Stone arch bridges in the United States
1887 establishments in New Jersey